Francesca Marsaglia (born 27 January 1990) is an Italian former World Cup alpine ski racer. She competed in five World Championships and the 2014 Winter Olympics. Born in Rome, Marsaglia is  the sister of fellow alpine racer Matteo Marsaglia.

World Cup results

Season standings

Podium finishes
1 podium

World Championship results

Olympic results

References

External links

Francesca Marsaglia at the Italian Winter Sports Federation (FISI) 

1990 births
Living people
Italian female alpine skiers
Alpine skiers at the 2014 Winter Olympics
Alpine skiers at the 2022 Winter Olympics
Olympic alpine skiers of Italy
Sportspeople from Rome